Stictea macropetana, the eucalyptus leafroller, is a moth of the family Tortricidae. It is native to Australia, but is an introduced species in New Zealand, where it was first recorded in 1921. It was first described by Edward Meyrick in 1881.

The wingspan is 13–19 mm. Males have uniform ash/grey forewings, with darker bands. Females have a light wavy band along the rear edge of the forewing, edged by a thin dark line. The male and female hindwings are a uniform brownish grey, containing a fringe of hairs along the edge.

The larvae feed on the leaves, buds and developing flowers of young eucalypts, including Eucalyptus microcorys, Eucalyptus nitens, Eucalyptus fastigata, Eucalyptus saligna,  Eucalyptus cladocalyx, Eucalyptus baxteri, Eucalyptus muelleriana, Eucalyptus obliqua, Eucalyptus globoidea, and Eucalyptus regnans. The larvae create a protective shelter from which they feed by combining silken threads and foliage. A single larva may construct several shelters within its life span. Young larvae scour the leaf surface as they feed, and may also excavate terminal buds. Continuous feeding and webbing results in a browned surface which eventually becomes skeletonised and dies. Young larvae are translucent green/yellow. Full-grown larvae are 8–14 mm long and become dark green. Pupation takes place in a silk cocoon in an old leaf roll, loose bark, dry leaf or within soil at the base of a tree.

References

External links

Citizen science observations in New Zealand

Olethreutini
Moths of Australia
Moths of New Zealand
Moths described in 1881